Piezo1 is a mechanosensitive ion channel protein that in humans is encoded by the gene PIEZO1.  Piezo1 and its close homolog Piezo2 were cloned in 2010, using an siRNA-based screen for mechanosensitive ion channels.

Structure and function 

PIEZO1 (this gene) and PIEZO2 share 47% identity with each other and they have no similarity to any other protein and contain no known protein domains. They are predicted to have 24-36 transmembrane domains, depending on the prediction algorithm used. In the original publication the authors were careful not to call the piezo proteins ion channels, but a more recent study by the same lab convincingly demonstrated that indeed piezo1 is the pore-forming subunit of a mechanosensitive channel. PIEZO1 homologues are found in C. elegans and Drosophila, which, like other invertebrates, have a single piezo protein.

It is known that Piezo1 channel is a three-bladed propeller-like structure. A lever-like mechanogating mechanism is assumed.

Tissue distribution 

Piezo1 is expressed in the lungs, bladder and skin, where mechanosensation has important biological roles. Unlike Piezo2 which is highly expressed in sensory dorsal root ganglia, piezo1 is not expressed in sensory neurons.

Clinical significance 

Piezo1 is also found in red blood cells, and gain of function mutations in the channels are associated with hereditary xerocytosis or stomatocytosis. Piezo1 channels are pivotal integrators in vascular biology.

An allele of Piezo1, E756del, results in a gain-of-function mutation, resulting in dehydrated RBCs and conveying resistance to Plasmodium. This allele has been demonstrated in vitro to prevent cerebral malaria infection.

Piezo1 has been implicated in extrusion of epidermal cells when a layer becomes too confluent to preserve normal skin homeostasis. This acts to prevent excess proliferation of skin tissue, and has been implicated in cancer biology as a contributing factor to metastases by assisting living cells in escaping from a monolayer.

Expression of murine PIEZO1 in mouse innate immune cells is essential for their function, a role mediated  by sensing mechanical cues. Deficiency in PIEZO1 in mice lead to increased susceptibility of myeloid cells to infection by Pseudomonas aeruginosa.

Ligands
 Agonists
 Jedi1/2
 Yoda1  (small molecule agonist)

Antagonists

 Gadolinium
 Streptomycin
 Ruthenium Red
 GsMTx4
 Dooku1

References 

Transmembrane proteins